This is a list of summer hits by year.

List

Summer hits in the United States 
 1958: "Nel Blu Dipinto Di Blu (Volaré)" – Domenico Modugno
 1964: "Where Did Our Love Go" – The Supremes
 1965: "(I Can't Get No) Satisfaction" – The Rolling Stones
 1976: "Don't Go Breaking My Heart" – Elton John & Kiki Dee
 1979: "Bad Girls" – Donna Summer
 1986: "Papa Don't Preach" - Madonna
 1996: "Macarena" by Los Del Rio
 1999: "Livin’ La Vida Loca" by Ricky Martin
 2005: "We Belong Together" by Mariah Carey
 2007: "Umbrella" by Rihanna
 2008: "I Kissed a Girl" by Katy Perry
 2009: “I Gotta Feeling” by The Black Eyed Peas
 2010: "California Gurls" by Katy Perry
 2011: "Party Rock Anthem" by LMFAO
 2012: "Gangnam Style" by Psy; "Call Me Maybe" by Carly Rae Jepsen
 2014: "Fancy" by Iggy Azalea ft. Charli XCX;  "Problem" by Ariana Grande ft. Iggy Azalea
 2016: "One Dance" by Drake;  "Can't Stop the Feeling!" by Justin Timberlake
 2017: "Despacito" by Luis Fonsi and Daddy Yankee featuring Justin Bieber
 2018: "In My Feelings" by Drake; "I Like It" by Cardi B, Bad Bunny and J Balvin,
 2019: "Old Town Road" by Lil Nas X and Billy Ray Cyrus; "Señorita" by Shawn Mendes and Camila Cabello
 2021: "Butter" by BTS
 2022: "As It Was", by Harry Styles

Worldwide 
 1989: "Lambada" by Kaoma
 2001: "El baile del gorila" by Melody (Spain)
 2002: "The Ketchup Song (Asereje)" by Las Ketchup
 2004: "Dragostea Din Tei" by O-Zone
 2005: "Axel F" by Crazy Frog; "La camisa negra" by Juanes (Europe); 
 2019: "Bad Guy" by Billie Eilish (Russia); "Con Altura" by Rosalía, J Balvin and El Guincho (Hispanic countries)

References 



Challenges